Shrideep Mangela (born 1 April 1988) is an Indian first-class cricketer who plays for Mumbai.

References

External links
 

1988 births
Living people
Indian cricketers
Mumbai cricketers
Cricketers from Mumbai